Kabiraj (Magahi: कबिराज) is an occupational title found in persons of Eastern Indian subcontinent. In olden days people traditionally practising Ayurveda were generally called kabi/kobi in eastern India. 

Many of them were attached to royal courts to treat kings and the royal family. As such they were given the title of Kabirāj/Kobirāj ("King Kabi", compare Rāj Vaidya used elsewhere). The descendants of such persons started using "Kabiraj" as a surname. This surname is often found in persons originating from Bangladesh and Indian States of West Bengal, Bihar, Assam and Orissa, which are in the same cultural region of the subcontinent and shares common linguistic origins.

See also
Kaviraj, similar sounding title but etymologically different
Vaidhya

References

Surnames
Indian surnames
Indian words and phrases
Titles in India
Titles in Bangladesh
Men's social titles
Cultural history of India
Traditional healthcare occupations
Linguistic history of India
Cultural history of Bangladesh